Timurid refers to those descended from Timur (Tamerlane), a 14th-century conqueror:

 Timurid dynasty, a dynasty of Turco-Mongol lineage descended from Timur who established empires in Central Asia and the Indian subcontinent
 Timurid Empire of Central Asia, founded by Timur
 Mughal Empire of the Indian subcontinent, founded by Timur's descendants (also sometimes referred to as the 'Timurid Empire')

See also
 Timur (disambiguation)